Bianjiang Town is a town and the county seat in the central south of Yongxing County, Hunan, China. Its seat is at Shuinan Village.

References

Yongxing County
County seats in Hunan
Towns of Chenzhou